The 2019 Intercontinental GT Challenge was the fourth season of the Intercontinental GT Challenge. The season featured five rounds, starting with the Liqui Moly Bathurst 12 Hour on 3 February and concluding with the Kyalami 9 Hours on 23 November. Tristan Vautier was the defending Drivers' champion and Audi was the defending Manufacturers' champion.

Calendar
At the annual press conference during the 2018 24 Hours of Spa on 27 July, the Stéphane Ratel Organisation announced the first draft of the 2019 calendar. Kyalami was added to the schedule. On 3 December, it was announced the nine-hour race in South Africa would be moved from 3 to 23 November to avoid a clash with the Rugby World Cup. The date of the California 8 Hours was confirmed on 18 January. The race was moved from Sunday to the Saturday the day before in order to better accommodate live TV.

Entry list

1 – Car No. 75 was nominated for manufacturer points at Round 1, but was not nominated for manufacturer points at Round 4.

Race results

Championship standings
Scoring system
Championship points were awarded for the first ten positions in each race. Entries were required to complete 75% of the winning car's race distance in order to be classified and earn points, with the exception of Bathurst where a car simply had to cross the finish line to be classified. Individual drivers were required to participate for a minimum of 25 minutes in order to earn championship points in any race. A manufacturer only received points for its two highest placed cars in each round.

Drivers' championships
The results indicate the classification relative to other drivers in the series, not the classification in the race.

Bronze Drivers

Manufacturers' championship
Only the top two cars of each specific manufacturer is eligible for points.

See also
Intercontinental GT Challenge

Notes

References

External links

 
2019 in motorsport